Joeperry Lake is a lake in the Lake Ontario drainage basin in Addington Highlands, Lennox and Addington County, Ontario, Canada.

Joeperry Lake is the source of the Skootamatta River. There is one inflow, an unnamed creek at the west of the lake. The primary outflow is the Skootamatta River, on the south side of the lake, south to Pearson Lake; a marsh at the east of the lake also connects to Pearson Lake. The Skootamatta River flows via the Moira River into the Bay of Quinte on Lake Ontario.

See also
List of lakes in Ontario

References

Lakes of Lennox and Addington County